Elections were held in Middlesex County, Ontario on October 27, 2014 in conjunction with municipal elections across the province.

Middlesex County Council
County Council consists of the mayors of each municipality plus the deputy mayors of the municipalities over 5,000 people.

Adelaide Metcalfe

Lucan Biddulph

Middlesex Centre

Newbury

North Middlesex

Southwest Middlesex

Strathroy-Caradoc

Thames Centre

References
 
AMO - 2014 Municipal Election Results

Middlesex
Middlesex County, Ontario